Mirza Kuchek Janghli District is a district (bakhsh) in Sowme'eh Sara County, Gilan Province, Iran. At the 2006 census, its population was 24,862, in 6,479 families.  The District has one city: Gurab Zarmikh. The District has two rural districts (dehestan): Gurab Zarmikh Rural District and Markiyeh Rural District.

References 

Sowme'eh Sara County
Districts of Gilan Province